Oxted is a town and civil parish in the Tandridge district of Surrey, England, at the foot of the North Downs.

Oxted is a commuter town with a railway station, with direct train services to London and has the district council offices. Its main developed area is contiguous with the village of Limpsfield. Six intermittent headwaters of the River Eden unite in the occasional market town including its furthest source, east of Titsey Place. The Eden feeds into Kent's longest river, the Medway.  Only the southern slope of the North Downs is steep and its towns and farmland form the Vale of Holmesdale, a series of headwaters across Surrey and Kent to separate rivers.

The settlements of Hurst Green and Holland within the civil parish to the south, including a public house named after Oxted, are continuous but almost wholly residential areas (contiguous neighbourhoods).

Toponymy
The first written mention of Oxted is from an Anglo-Saxon charter of 862 AD, in which it appears as Acustyde. In the Domesday Book of 1086, the settlement is recorded as Acstede. In later documents, it appears as Akested (12th century), Axsted, Axstude and Ocsted  (13th century) and Oxsted (14th century). The name derives from the Old English āc meaning "oak" and stede meaning "place". Oxted is generally agreed to mean "place of oak trees". 

Hurst Green is first recorded in the mid-15th century as le Herst in a deed of Edward IV and as Herste grene in 1577. The name is thought to mean "open space by the wood (hurst)". "Holland" appears in 1757 as Hollands and is thought to mean "land by the hill".

Geography

Location and topography

It is on the Greenwich Meridian, which passes through Oxted School, Station Road East and East Hill (the A25). The town straddles the London to East Grinstead railway line, which runs roughly north–south through the Parish.

The civil parish extends from the North Downs in the north to the settlement of Holland in the south. It includes Old Oxted and Hurst Green, which are to the west and south of the town respectively. Although the urban area of Limpsfield is contiguous with that of Oxted, the village is part of a separate parish. Much of Oxted and the surrounding area is drained by the headwaters of the River Eden, a tributary of the River Medway.

Geology
The oldest outcrops in the area are of Weald Clay, which comes to the surface in the south of the civil parish. Gravels deposited by earlier courses of the River Eden and its tributaries, are found above the clay in the same area. A thin band of Atherfield Clay comes to the surface between Hurst Green and Oxted, north of which are the Sandgate Beds, which overlie the Hythe Beds. The town centre is primarily on the Folkestone Beds, which take the form of a ferruginous quartz-rich sandstone, containing seams of ironstone and mica. To the west of Oxted railway station, there is a thin wash of pebbles, thought to have been deposited by river action during the Pleistocene. To the north of the town, the chalk of the North Downs has historically been divided into three bands: lower chalk, middle chalk and upper chalk.

History

Early history
The earliest evidence of human activity in the civil parish is from the Iron Age and finds include a metal brooch dating from the 3rd or 4th centuries BCE. During the Roman period, the roads from London to Lewes and London to Brighton ran either side of Oxted. The name Oxted suggests that the modern settlement was founded in the Anglo-Saxon period and it is possible that St Mary's Church is built on a pre-Christian religious site. From late Saxon times, the area was administered as part of the Tandridge Hundred.

Governance
Oxted appears in the Domesday Book as Acsted and was held by Eustace II, Count of Boulogne. Its Domesday assets were: 5 hides; 1 church, 2 mills worth 12s 6d, 20 ploughs,  of meadow, pannage worth 100 hogs. It rendered £14 and 2d from a house in Southwark to its feudal overlords per year.

The early medieval manor of Oxted was centred on Oxted Court Farm, to the south of St Mary's Church. For much of this period, up until the end of the 13th century, it was held by the de Acstede family, who were mesne lords to the Crown. As the Middle Ages progressed, Oxted was broken up into smaller estates. In around 1246, Broadham manor, thought to have been centred on the present day Broadham Green, to the west of Hurst Green, was granted to Battle Abbey. Similarly, in 1283, the "Bursted" or "Birsted" estate was granted in perpetuity to Tandridge Priory,  but it is unclear where in the parish this land was located.

The last male member of the de Acstede family, Roland de Acstede, was summoned to Parliament in 1290, but he died shortly afterwards. His estate was inherited by his five daughters, each of whom was given a share of the land. By 1300, one part of the manor was held by the sisters Clarica and Alina de Acstede, with the remainder by Hugh de Nevile. In 1342, John de Wellesworth, grandson of Roland, sold the de Acstede portion of the manor to Robert de Stangrave and his wife Joan.

Following the death of Robert de Stangrave in 1344, the former de Acstede portion of the manor of Oxted passed to his wife's family, the Cobhams. and in around 1350, John de Nevile, sold the remainder to them. The Cobham family lived at Starborough Castle near Lingfield and their lands in Oxted were run by a resident steward from Oxted Court Farm. By the mid-17th century, Barrow Green Court appears to have superseded Oxted Court Farm as the manor house. The Hoskins family held Oxted until the death of Susannah Hoskins in 1868, when it was inherited by her aunt, Katherine Master. She passed the manor to her descendants, the Hoskins Master family.

The civil parish of Oxted was formed in 1894. Oxted was part of the Godstone Rural District from 1894 until 1974, when it was combined with the Caterham and Warlingham Urban District to create the Tandridge District.

Transport and communications
The turnpike road from Wrotham Heath to Godstone passed through the town. The modern-day A25 road divides the original town ("Old Oxted") from "New Oxted", the development that grew up to the north-east after the railway station opened in 1884. A bypass diverting the A25 to the north of Old Oxted was built in the late 1960s.

The first act of Parliament to authorise the construction of a railway through Oxted was granted in July 1865. It authorised the Surrey and Sussex Junction Railway (S&SJR) to build a line from Croydon to Groombridge, where there was to be a junction with the East Grinstead to Tunbridge Wells line. The act was controversial as the S&SJR was sponsored by the London, Brighton and South Coast Railway (LBSCR), but ran into a part of Surrey and East Sussex which was considered South Eastern Railway territory.

In three years, the S&SJR managed to build the  Oxted Tunnel and two shorter tunnels at Riddlesdown and Limpsfield. However, construction became increasingly difficult as a result of the 1866 financial panic caused by failure of Overend, Gurney and Company and, in 1869, there was a riot at Edenbridge because Belgian navvies were being employed to build line. A second act of Parliament was obtained in 1869 to formally transfer line to the LBSCR, who immediately asked for powers to suspend works. The company paid a penalty of £32,250 and construction ceased immediately. No work took place on the unfinished railway line until 1878, when a third act of Parliament authorised the Croydon, Oxted and East Grinstead railway, which would take over construction and be jointly owned by LBSCR and SER. Among the works that were completed by the new company was the iron viaduct between Oxted station and Limpsfield tunnel.

The new line finally opened to passenger traffic in March 1884. Oxted station, originally called Oxted and Limpsfield, was provided with two through platforms and a south-facing bay platform. There was also a freight yard with a south-facing connection to the line. A second station in the parish, Hurst Green Halt opened with line and was replaced by Hurst Green station, to the north, by British Rail in 1961.

The line south from Hurst Green to Eridge was opened in December 1887. A century later, in 1987, Hurst Green Junction signal box closed as part of a resignalling programme for the whole line.  Electrification of the line through Oxted to East Grinstead completed July 1987, but the line to Uckfield remains unelectrified.

Residential development
Although there is thought to have been a religious building on the site of St Mary's Church since before the Norman Conquest, it is unclear whether there was a significant nucleated settlement close to the site. It is possible that much of the population was thinly dispersed throughout the parish until the 12th century.

The settlement of Old Oxted was founded in the 13th and 14th centuries, to the south east of St Mary's Church, centred on a crossroads where the Guildford to Canterbury road met Beadle's Lane (leading to the south) and Brook Hill (leading to London via the ascent of the North Downs). The street plan does not appear to have changed significantly since medieval times, although the surface of the High Street appears to have been lowered at some stage, most likely to reduce the steepness of the gradient as it approaches the stream at its east end. The oldest buildings in the village, 2-6 Godstone Road and The Old Bell pub, date from the 15th and 16th centuries. Several of the houses are thought to have originated as open hall houses, which have since been modified.

The opening of the railway line through Oxted in 1884, stimulated a rapid of phase of development in the parish. Since the line crossed the Guildford to Canterbury Road on an iron viaduct, it was not practical to build a station at this point. The site chosen for the station was to the northeast of Old Oxted and to the east of St Mary's Church.

With the arrival of the railway in 1884 (after many years' delay caused by lack of funds) Oxted boomed in line with London's trade growth around its station, north-east of Old Oxted, and new buildings created "New Oxted". These new buildings were built in the Tudor style, particularly with stucco frontages. All Saints Catholic Church was built in 1913–1928 designed by Arts & Crafts architect James L. Williams (died 1926, his other work includes Royal School of Needlework, St George's in Sudbury, London (1926–27) and The Pound House in Totteridge (1907)). The United Reformed Church's building followed in 1935, which is listed for its coloured glass and Byzantine design by architect Frederick Lawrence.

In 2011 The Daily Telegraph listed Oxted as the twentieth richest town in Britain.

Oxted in the Second World War
During the Second World War, the defence of the Oxted and the surrounding area was coordinated by the 9th Surrey Battalion of the Home Guard. In September 1939, the boys of Haberdashers Aske 's School were evacuated to the town and a public Anderson shelter was constructed on Master Park. Two fighter aircraft, a Hawker Hurricane and a Messerschmitt Bf 109 crashed in the civil parish in August 1940.

National and local government
Oxted is in the parliamentary constituency of East Surrey and has been represented at Westminster since May 2019 by Conservative Claire Coutinho.

There is one representative on Surrey County Council, Conservative Cameron McIntosh. There are six representatives on Tandridge District Council with much of Oxted South being Hurst Green :

There is also a parish council with 11 members.

Demography and housing

The average level of accommodation in the region composed of detached houses was 28%, the average that was apartments was 22.6%.

The proportion of households in the civil parish who owned their home outright compares to the regional average of 35.1%.  The proportion who owned their home with a loan compares to the regional average of 32.5%.  The remaining % is made up of rented dwellings (plus a negligible % of households living rent-free).

Culture and community

Band and civic centre
Oxted is one of the few Surrey towns to retain a town brass band, Oxted Band, which has been a fixture within the town since 1901. The town became the administrative town of the Tandridge District when it was established in 1974.

Pram race
Oxted is host to a charity pram race held annually. It was started in 1977 by Eric and Elsie Hallson, who ran it for nearly 20 years before retiring. Entrants wear fancy dress and must push a pram around the two-thirds of a mile course, stopping at each of the seven licensed premises on the way to quaff a drink as quickly as they can. The race ends in Old Oxted high street where the road is closed for the evening and a street party is held.

Events in Master Park
The park hosts annual events such as that run by the local football/cricket club. Every year there is also the Oxted Beer Festival.

Barn Theatre
The Barn Theatre was conceived as a public hall for the local parishes and was opened on 22 May 1924 by the playwright Harley Granville-Barker. The building, parts of which date from between 1362 and 1433, was originally used as a barn for a sawmill and was moved from Limpsfield to its current site in Blue House Lane. A rehearsal space was constructed to the rear of the theatre in 1931 and a cyclorama was installed in the building in 1968. In 2021, the auditorium has 244 seats. A project to reconfigure the entrance and foyer areas is underway in advance of the theatre's centenary celebrations in 2024.

Transport

Oxted railway station and Hurst Green railway station are on the Oxted Line. Southbound trains run to either  via  or to  via .

Oxted is also served by a total of four bus routes, operated by Southdown PSV (routes 236, 410, 594, 595). These services provide connections to Westerham, Redhill, Godstone, Edenbridge and East Grinstead.

Education 
St Mary's C of E Primary School opened as a National school in Beadles Lane in 1872. Between 1963 and 1974, it moved in stages to its current site in Silkham Road. In 2018, it merged with the adjacent Downs Way School to create a primary school with a total enrolment of 660 pupils.

Hurst Green Infant School opened as a primary school in 1960. In 1993, it became an infants school with a nursery department and since then has educated children aged from two to eight. Holland Junior School opened in 1971 as a middle school. It became a junior school in 1993 and educates pupils aged from eight to eleven.

Oxted School was opened in 1929 and was the first co-educational grammar school in Surrey. Originally called Oxted Secondary School, it opened with 22 pupils, but numbers had grown to 120 by 1932. Following the Second World War, it adopted the name Oxted County School and was renamed to Oxted School in September 1999. In August 1998, a fire destroyed 22 classrooms, the dining hall and the library, but the school reopened for the Autumn Term on time, with many lessons held in temporary buildings. A replacement building, named the Meridian Building, was opened in January 2000. The refurbished arts centre was opened in 2019 by musician Richard Stilgoe as part of the school's 90th anniversary celebrations.

Moor House School and College, in Hurst Green, was founded in 1947 by the neurologist Cecil Worster-Drought to educate children with speech and language impairments. Initially it catered for residential students only, but in 2011 it began to admit day pupils and, a year later, a sixth-form centre was opened. The new residential student village was opened by Sophie, Countess of Wessex in October 2016.

Limpsfield Grange is a SEND school for girls and formerly an open air school.

Places of worship

St Mary's Church

A church is mentioned in the entry for Oxted in the Domesday Book and St Mary's Church is thought to be on the same site. The oldest part of the current church is the tower, which is constructed of Bargate stone with brick battlements and which is thought to date from the 12th century. The octagonal stone font and the chancel date from the 13th century. The aisles, built partly from clunch, were added in the 14th century along with the stained glass panels in the east window, depicting the four Evangelists. The building was damaged by fires following lightning strikes in 1637 and in 1719, and the second incident resulted in the destruction of the ring of bells. In the late 19th and early 20th centuries, new windows, designed by Edward Burne-Jones and Marjorie Kemp, were installed in the aisles and chancel respectively.

St John's Church, Hurst Green
The foundation stone of St John's Church was laid in July 1912 and was consecrated a year later by the Bishop of Southwark. It was dedicated to John the Evangelist and initially was a daughter church to St Mary's. A new parish was created in 1953. It was designed by John Oldrid Scott in the Gothic Revival style and was built on land owned by Uvedale Lambert, who lived at South Park, Bletchingley. Scott is commemorated in the  rose window above the altar, which was given by his family in 1914.

On 1 April 1988, an arson attack took place and the resulting fire destroyed much of the interior. During the subsequent rebuilding, the opportunity was taken to remodel the church, and both the rood screen and altar rails were repositioned to make the chancel more accessible from the nave. The new font cover and two mural panels were designed by the artist John Hayward. A carved oak eagle was presented to the church by the Rev'd Hugh Ford to celebrate its rededication on 1 April 1990.

All Saints' Catholic Church

The first Catholic Mass to be celebrated in Oxted since the Reformation took place in a garden shed in April 1914. Three months later, a plot of land on Chichele Road had been purchased for a new church from the Barrow Green estate. The building was designed by James Leonard Williams in the neo Gothic style and the foundation stone was laid in August 1914.  The first mass took place in the completed crypt in October of the same year, but building work ceased for much of the First World War and the shell of the church was not completed until December 1919.

The church bell dates from 1768, but was recast in 1862 and purchased for All Saints' in 1922. The following year, the stained glass window of St Hedwig, designed by Margaret Agnes Rope was installed in the lady chapel. The church was finally consecrated on 6 July 1927 and the elaborately carved reredos was finished in the same year. The waggon roof, decorated to a design of Geoffrey Fuller Webb, was completed in 1928 and the Stations of the Cross, carved in oak, were installed in 1931. During the Second World War, an incendiary bomb fell on the church, but the fire was extinguished before it could spread to the roof.

Church of the Peace of God

The first congregational church in Oxted was opened in Station Road East in 1902. By the early 1930s, it had become unable to cope with the number of worshippers and so a new church, named the Church of the Peace of God, was built in 1934–35. It was designed by Frederick Lawrence in the Byzanitine style and was constructed in red-brown brick. The church has a cruciform plan, oriented north–south, and has a central square tower. The church underwent considerable alteration in 2000, with the addition of an entrance concourse at the front and a new hall at the rear. The sanctuary was also refurbished and the church was rededicated in March 2002.

Sport

Leisure Centre
Tandridge Leisure Centre was opened in 1990. It was run by the district council until 2000, when management was transferred to a private company, Tandridge Leisure and Culture Trust. Freedom Leisure took over the operation of the centre in May 2018. The centre offers a fitness gym, exercise studio, a 25-metre fitness pool, and a lagoon pool with a  flume slide.

Association Football
Oxted and District Football Club was founded in 1894 and the team have played their home games at Master Park for over a century.

Cricket
The first recorded cricket match including a team from Oxted took place at Caterham in 1840 and the first known matches in Oxted took place in 1855 and 1857 on Broadham Green. Oxted United Cricket Club was formed  and ran until 1893. Oxted and Limpsfield Cricket Club was formed November 1889 and the first matches took place following year on Marls Field, much of which later became Master Park. The pavilion on Master Park was constructed by 1906.

Parks and open spaces

Great and Little Earls Woods
The sites are designated as ancient semi-natural woodland and the dominant tree species are oak and sweet chestnut.

Master Park
The  Master Park has been used as an outdoor recreation area since before 1900, although formal permission was only granted by the Hoskins Masters family in 1920. Three years later, a trust was formed to manage the park and local sports teams began to play matches there. The pavilion dates from 1996 and replaced an earlier building constructed in 1967. A red oak tree was planted at the park in 1994, to celebrate the centenary of Oxted Parish Council. The children's playground was opened in 2000.

Mill Lane Playing Fields, Hurst Green
The  Mill Lane Playing Fields are owned by the District Council and leased by the Holland Sports and Social Association. The facilities include an athletics track and various sports pitches. The pavilion provides changing facilities and a licensed bar. The fields have been legally protected by the charity, Fields in Trust, since 1961 and are designated under the King George V Fields scheme.

Notable residents

 Douglas Pyne (18471888) Irish nationalist politician  born and grew up at Oxted Place.
 Commander William Ibbett (18861975) submariner  born in Oxted.
 Beatrice Harrison (18921965) cellist  lived at "Foyle Riding", Red Lane, Oxted for much of her life.
 Albert Houthuesen (19031979) artist  lived at Stone Hall, Oxted from 1950 to 1952.
 Michael Tippett (19051998) composer  lived in Oxted from 1929 until 1951.
 Thomas Ernest Bennett 'Tibby' Clarke (19071989) screenwriter  lived at Oakleigh Court, Oxted.
 Bert Hardy (19131995) photographer  lived in Oxted from 1964 until his death.
 Alan Charig (19271997) palaeontologist, author and broadcaster  lived in Oxted from 1958 until his death.
 Mohamed Al-Fayed (b. 1929) businessman  has lived at Barrow Green Court since the 1970s.
 Sir Henry Cooper (19342011) heavyweight boxer  died at Bourne House, Uvedale Road.
 Keir Starmer (b. 1962) leader of the Labour Party  grew up in the town.
 Nicky Forster (b. 1973) football player  grew up in Hurst Green.
 Louise Redknapp (b. 1974) singer  lived in Oxted as a child.
 Laura Trott (b. 1984) MP for Sevenoaks  grew up in the town.
 Ellie Soutter (20002018) snowboarder  grew up in Oxted.

See also

 List of places of worship in Tandridge (district)
 The Oxted Station Outrage, a farcical incident in which Harold Laski bombed the men's lavatory at Oxted railway station in a gesture of solidarity with the suffragettes.
 Titsey Place

Notes

References

Bibliography

 
 
 
 
 
 
 
 
 
 
 
 
 
 
 
 
 
 
 
 
 
 
 

 
Towns in Surrey
Tandridge
Civil parishes in Surrey